Jim, Jimmy, Jamie, or James Lawson may refer to:

Academics
James Raymond Lawson (1915–1996), African-American physicist and president of Fisk University
James Lawson (activist) (born 1928), American professor, civil rights scholar and pastor

Public officials
James Lawson, Lord Lawson (before 1500—after 1532), Scottish Senator of College of Justice and Provost of Edinburgh
James Anthony Lawson (1817–1887), Irish MP, Solicitor-General and Attorney-General
James Marshall Lawson (1863–1922), American Republican state legislator in South Dakota
Earl Lawson (politician) (James Earl Lawson, 1891–1950), Canadian MP from Ontario

Sportsmen
Jimmy Lawson (Scottish footballer) (1886–1962), right back (Dundee FC), golfer in U.S.
Jim Lawson (American football) (1902–1989), end and placekicker
Jimmy Lawson (English footballer) (born 1947), winger and player-manager
Jim Lawson (sports executive) (born 1958), Canadian ice hockey centre, businessman and lawyer
Jamie Lawson (American football) (born 1965), NFL fullback
Jamie Lawson (Australian footballer) (born 1971), rover with Sydney Swans
James Lawson (footballer) (born 1987), English winger and striker
James Lawson (swimmer) (born 1995), Zimbabwean at 2017 World Aquatics Championships

Writers
James Lawson (minister) (1538–1584) Church of Scotland biographer of John Knox
James Lawson Drummond (1783–1853), Irish physician, naturalist and botanical writer
James Gilchrist Lawson (1874–1946), British Christian author and compiler
James R. Lawson (1918–1985), American anti-Imperialist activist and black nationalist writer
James Lawson (Australian doctor) (born 1934), breast cancer researcher and author
Jim Lawson (comics) (born 1960), American comic book writer and artist
Jamie Lawson (musician) (born 1975), English singer-songwriter and musician
Jamie Lawson (album), Lawson's 2015 self-titled album

See also
James and Mary Lawson House, American 1869 historic structure in Woodstown, New Jersey